The WFL All-Time Team is a list of the top players in the history of the World Football League chosen by fans of the WFL. It includes a First-team, a Second-team. Absent from the team are the high-dollar signees from the National Football League, such as Larry Csonka, Paul Warfield, Calvin Hill, Duane Thomas, John Gilliam, George Sauer, and others. The WFL had all-league teams chosen in 1974 by "The Sporting News" and by the players/coaches . The World Football League played in 1974 and 1975, although the 1975 season was ended after 12 of 18 scheduled games.

Offense

Defense

Special teams

Coach

References

1975 Southern California Sun Media Guide.
1975 Memphis Grizzlies Media Guide.

External links